Betsy Eby (born April 3, 1967) is an American artist and musician known for her abstract encaustic paintings. Eby lives and works in Columbus, Georgia and Wheaton Island, Maine.

Life

Eby was born April 3, 1967 in Seaside, Oregon.  In 1972, her family moved to the suburbs of Portland, Oregon.  Her father worked in the timber industry, and her mother worked in community college admissions. At the age of five, Eby began playing the piano and learned the traditional classical repertoire. She continues to study seriously under master musicians.

Eby earned her bachelor's degree in art history at the University of Oregon, with an emphasis in ancient Greek, Roman and Asian antiquities.  In 1990 she moved to Seattle, Washington, where she lived and worked until 2013, when she and her husband, American artist Bo Bartlett, moved to Columbus, Georgia. They now share their time between Columbus, Georgia and Wheaton Island, Maine. In 2018, Eby and Bartlett opened the Bo Bartlett Center at Columbus State University, an interactive gallery space designed to engage nearby communities through arts programming.

Work

Betsy Eby works primarily in encaustic, a painting medium of hot beeswax, damar resin, and pigments. The encaustic technique dates back to the 4th century B.C., when it was originally used for Egyptian mummy funerary portraits. Encaustic was not a common medium for painters until its revival by the Pop artist, Jasper Johns, in his iconic flag paintings.

Eby uses a technique of layering and spreading pigmented wax over her canvas using brushes and knives. She liquefies the wax with a blowtorch and the layers are fused, resulting in the illusion of surface depth and translucency. This illusion is heightened by Eby's use of impasto on the surface of her canvases.

Her work expresses atmosphere and motion in a style Eby has referred to as “lyrical abstraction.” An accomplished classical pianist, music bears a prominent influence in her artworks, which are often inspired by and titled after pieces of classical and contemporary music by composers such as John Cage, Alan Hovhaness, Johannes Brahms and Claude Debussy.

Eby's native Pacific Northwest inspires her misty palette and foggy, blurred edges, while her study of Japanese art lends restraint and intentionality to her practice. Early influences on her work include Morris Graves and Mark Tobey, among a group of artists known as the Northwest Mystics, known for their muted colors and economy of brush. Since moving to Georgia, Eby has explored the richness of the light and an expanded color palette.

Eby is guided by the idea that “the health of our environment is a mirror to the health of our collective conscience.” In the South, Eby is keenly aware of the edges defined by the cultural tension of competing beliefs related to race, religion, and politics. She finds parallels between this cultural tension and the natural environment during her studies of nature in Maine, where changes in weather can be sudden and severe.

In 2018 Betsy Eby was to chosen to represent the United States as a Cultural Exchange Artist through the U.S. State Department's Art in Embassies program in Papua New Guinea and The Solomon Islands. As a cultural exchange artist, Eby aimed to promote a message of female empowerment through creativity, through working with local artists, and participating in television and radio interviews.

Film
Betsy Eby is also a film producer and musician for film. In 2013, she and Bo Bartlett released the feature-length documentary film SEE, An Art Road Trip. In 2019, she was executive producer and musician for the feature-length film Things Don’t Stay Fixed, the documentary short film Helga, and the documentary Lobster Dinner.

Collections & Exhibitions 

Betsy Eby has exhibited widely across the United States. Her 2013 solo exhibition, “Painting with Fire,” traveled to the Columbus Museum of Art in Columbus, GA; the Morris Museum of Art in Augusta, GA; the Center for Maine Contemporary Art in Rockport, ME; and the Ogden Museum in New Orleans, LA.  Eby's works are held in the collections of the Tacoma Art Museum, Tacoma, WA, the Columbus Museum of Art, Columbus, GA, the Georgia Museum of Art, Athens, GA, and several United States Embassies around the world.

References

External links
 Official website
 

People from Seaside, Oregon
1967 births
Living people
University of Oregon alumni
Pacific Northwest artists
American women painters
Painters from Washington (state)
21st-century American women artists
American contemporary painters
Abstract painters